Kaiulani Lee is an American actress. She is best known for her portrayal of Rachel Carson in both the film and stage version of A Sense of Wonder, which she also wrote. A Sense of Wonder the film was released in 2010 Directed by Christopher Monger, Director of Photography by Haskell Wexler, ASC. She has been touring with the show for almost 30 years as well as with "Can't Scare Me...the Story of Mother Jones" which debuted at the Atlas Theater Performing Arts Center Space at George Mason University. In "Can't Scare Me.." also written by Lee, she portrays Mother Jones. The play is drawn from Mother Jones's autobiography, her letters, speeches, interviews and transcripts.

Kaiulani Lee is also a well known stage, television, and film actress. She was nominated for a Drama Desk Award for Outstanding Featured Actress in a Play for Kennedy's Children. She received an Obie Award for Best Performance by an Actress, Safe House.

Her film and television work includes The World According to Garp, Cujo, Before and After, A Bird of the Air, Stephanie Daley, The Waltons, Law & Order, amongst others. She starred as Martha Ballard in PBS's A Midwife's Tale.

References 

American actresses